The 1975 Algerian Cup Final was the 13th final of the Algerian Cup. The final took place on June 19, 1975, at July 5 Stadium in Algiers. MC Oran beat MO Constantine 2–0 to win their first Algerian Cup.

Pre-match

Details

References

Cup
Algeria
Algerian Cup Finals
MC Oran matches